Pauline was a 44-gun  of the French Navy.

Service history
On 27 February 1809, along , she captured the 32-gun . In October 1809, she sailed from Toulon to escort a convoy bound for Barcelona.

Pauline was then used for convoy escort in the Mediterranean. She took part in the action of 29 November 1811, fleeing the battle while frigate  and the smaller  were captured by the British. Her commanding officer, Captain François-Gilles Montfort, was subsequently court-martialled and relieved of command.

On 11 April 1814, she was renamed Bellone. She took part in the landing at Sidi Ferruch during the Invasion of Algiers in 1830, and used as a ferry the following years.

Citations

Sources and references

 HMS Ambuscade website

Age of Sail frigates of France
Hortense-class frigates
1807 ships
Ships built in France